Delio may refer to:

Given name 
Delio Caron (born c. 1924), Italian rugby player
Délio dos Santos (died 2020), Brazilian politician
Delio Fernández (born 1986), Spanish cyclist
Delio Gamboa (1936–2018), Colombian footballer
Delio Hernández Valadés (born 1956), Mexican politician
Delio Morollón (1937–1992), Spanish footballer
Delio Rodríguez (1916–1994), Spanish road racing cyclist and sprinter
Delio Rossi (born 1960), Italian football manager and former footballer
Delio Onnis (born 1948), Italian-Argentine footballer
Delio Tessa (1886–1939), Italian poet
Delio Toledo (born 1976), Paraguayan footballer

Surname 
Michelle Delio, American journalist and writer
Thomas DeLio (born 1951), American experimental music composer

See also 
Delio Lake, is a lake in the Province of Varese, Lombardy, Italy